Kenneth R. Koedinger (born 1962 in Wisconsin) is a professor of human–computer interaction and psychology at Carnegie Mellon University. He is the founding and current director of the Pittsburgh Science of Learning Center. He is widely known for his role in the development of the Cognitive Tutor software. He is also widely published in cognitive psychology, intelligent tutoring systems, and educational data mining, and his research group has repeatedly won "Best Paper" awards at scientific conferences in those areas, such as the EDM2008 Best Paper, ITS2006 Best Paper, ITS2004 Best Paper, and ITS2000 Best Paper.

Education 
Koedinger received his bachelor's degree in Mathematics and Computer Science from the University of Wisconsin–Madison, working with Richard Lehrer, and his M.S. in Computer Science from the University of Wisconsin–Madison. He then obtained his Ph.D. in Cognitive Psychology from Carnegie Mellon University. His doctoral advisor was John Robert Anderson.

Career 
Koedinger worked as a Research Scientist in the Human-Computer Interaction Institute at Carnegie Mellon University. Eventually, Koedinger became an Associate Professor and subsequently a professor at Carnegie Mellon University.  He has had many prestigious graduate students and post-doctoral fellows, in particular Neil Heffernan and Vincent Aleven.

Research 
Knowledge-Learning-Instruction Framework (KLI Framework)

Koedinger studied and developed the KLI framework of Learning Science. In 2012, Koedinger, along with his colleague Albert Corbett from the HCII and Charles Perfetti from the University of Pittsburgh, introduced the Knowledge-Learning-Instruction framework. The propositions within the KLI framework can help generate research questions within specific domains and instructional situations that, with further work, yield precise and falsifiable predictions. The KLI framework relates a set of observable and unobservable events: Learning Events, Instructional Events, Assessment Events and Knowledge Components.
 Instructional Events: Variations, typically planned, in the learning environment that are intended to produce learning. Instructional Events cause Learning Events. 
 Learning Events: Changes in cognitive and brain states that can be inferred from data, but cannot be directly observed or directly controlled.
 Assessment Events: Involve student responses that are evaluated. Assessment Events are usually test items that can be directly observed, but they can also be embedded in the context of instruction.
 Knowledge Components: A description of a mental structure or process that a learner uses, alone or in combination with other knowledge components, to accomplish steps in a task or a problem. A knowledge component is also closely related to an assessment event, since it is an acquired unit of cognitive function or structure that can be inferred from performance on a set of related tasks.

Cognitive Tutor

Koedinger has a huge contribution to the Intelligent Tutoring System (ITS), and developed several cognitive tutor software to aid the traditional classroom learning. Among which the "Cognitive Tutor Algebra" is one of the precursors of the ITS. In 2006, Koedinger and Albert Corbett invented the Cognitive Tutor Algebra from their Cognitive Tutor research. It is intended to provide students with immediate step by step hints and feedback, which traditional classroom practice can not provide.

In 2011, Koedinger, and his colleagues Ido Roll, Vincent Aleven and Bruce M. McLaren introduced the Help Tutor, an enhanced version of the Geometry Cognitive Tutor that is capable of giving immediate metacognitive feedback on students' help-seeking errors. As an enhanced version, the Help Tutor teaches help-seeking skills by giving metacognitive feedback on students' help-seeking errors in the context of learning a domain-specific problem-solving skill. The Help Tutor messages include only domain-independent metacognitive content for several reasons: to encourage students to focus more on the metacognitive feedback (and not be distracted by domain content), to help students generalize the help-seeking skills, and to make the Help Tutor reusable with different Cognitive Tutors.

See also 
Learning Sciences
Cognitive Tutor
Learning sciences
ACT-R
John Robert Anderson (psychologist)
Vincent Aleven
Ryan Baker
Bruce M. McLaren

References

External links 
Koedinger's personal page at Carnegie Mellon
Pittsburgh Science of Learning Center (PSLC)
Authoring tool for intelligent tutoring systems

American cognitive scientists
American educational psychologists
Computational psychologists
1962 births
Living people
University of Wisconsin–Madison College of Letters and Science alumni
Carnegie Mellon University alumni
Carnegie Mellon University faculty
Human-Computer Interaction Institute faculty